Akkul (Aqkül) is a rural locality (a village) in Staromusinsky Selsoviet, Karmaskalinsky District, Bashkortostan, Russia. The population was 38 as of 2010. There is 1 street.

Geography 
Akkul is located 25 km northwest of Karmaskaly (the district's administrative centre) by road. Novoandreyevka is the nearest rural locality.

References 

Rural localities in Karmaskalinsky District